Cilento is an Italian geographical region. The adjective is Cilentan. For example:
 Cilentan Coast
 Cilentan language

Cilento may also refer to:

People
 Diane Cilento (1933–2011), Australian theatre and film actress
 Giuseppe Cilento (1923–1994), Brazilian chemist 
 Phyllis Cilento, Australian medical practitioner and journalist specialising in health of mothers and children
 Raphael Cilento (1893–1985), Australian medical practitioner notable in the field of tropical medicine
 Wayne Cilento (born 1949), American dancer and choreographer 

Places in the Cilento region of Italy
 Cilento and Vallo di Diano National Park